Cape Nordkinn ( or ) at  is the northernmost point on the Nordkinn Peninsula in  county, Norway. It is notable for being the northernmost point of mainland Norway, and by extension the northernmost point of mainland Europe. The cape is located on the border of the municipalities of Gamvik and Lebesby.

Geography

Tourism

In sharp contrast to North Cape with its extensive tourist infrastructure and busloads of visitors, Cape Nordkinn is a lonely but impressive place that can only be visited following at least a full-day hike from Mehamn and one day back. The terrain is sufficiently difficult for hiking, consisting largely of several kilometers long rock fields, that it is advisable to prepare for more than two days for the round trip, since it is  one way. There is no actual trail, only erected poles and cairns at rather long distances apart.

It is advisable not to travel in rainy weather, as the slippery stones make the terrain very difficult, with sudden fogs and associated whiteout. In fog the orientation on the highland south of the cape can be impossible without a GPS. There is mobile phone coverage in the area, except on west facing slopes.

The cape can also be reached by boat tours. The tourist bureau of Gamvik municipality provides tourist information. Hurtigruten ships call at Mehamn and Kjøllefjord to the southwest of the cape, providing a sighting opportunity for visitors on the way.

References

Nordkinn
Peninsulas of Troms og Finnmark
Extreme points of Earth
Gamvik
Lebesby
Landforms of Troms og Finnmark